The Christian Reformed Church of Sri Lanka (formerly known as the Dutch Reformed Church of Sri Lanka) is the oldest Protestant church on the island.

History

Beginnings and development 
On 6 October 1642, the first Protestant church service was held in Galle, following the capture of the fort at Galle by Willem Jacobszoon Coster in 1640. Protestantism was introduced as a missionary religion in Sri Lanka in 1658 by Dutch missionaries after the Dutch defeated the Portuguese on the island. When the Dutch took over there were already three religions present, Buddhism, Hinduism and Catholicism. All Roman Catholic churches, schools, and monasteries were transferred to the Dutch Reformed Church. The DRC church membership grew rapidly, and in the 18th century there were over 53,000 members in Colombo and 200,000 in Jaffna. The Reformed Calvinist faith was propagated by its schools. During a period the Reformed Church was the state religion. The Dutch period started in 1656 and lasted until the late 1700s. In 1796 the British occupied the Maritime Province of Ceylon, and Ceylon remained a British Crown Colony for the next 150 years. When the island become a British colony, many Dutch ministers left, and the church system collapsed. In the 19th and 20th centuries DRC church membership consisted of the Burghers, a Dutch word for citizens. They were not necessarily of Dutch origin, but were persons who held to Calvinist faith. But in the 19th century membership begin to broaden, with separate Tamil and Singhala congregations being formed.

Recent history 
In 1992 the church celebrated its 350th anniversary. It is the oldest Protestant denomination in the island of Sri Lanka, and the Wolvendaal (which means the 'Valley of Wolves') Church is the oldest Protestant church building. The latter church celebrated its 250th anniversary in 2007. Over the past years attempts have been made to increase church membership through evangelism. In 2008 the Dutch Reformed Church changed its name to the Christian Reformed Church in Sri Lanka.

Current status 
The Christian Reformed Church of Sri Lanka currently has 31 churches and over 5,000 adherents. The church office is located in Galle Road, Colombo.

Doctrine and practice

Creeds 
Apostles Creed
Athanasian Creed
Nicene Creed

Confessions 
 Belgic Confession
 Canons of Dort
 Heidelberg Catechism

Relationships 
 National Christian Council in Sri Lanka
 National Christian Evangelical Alliance in Sri Lanka
The church has sister church relations with the Christian Reformed Church in North America, Dutch Reformed Church of South Africa and since 2008 the fraternal relation was restored with the Reformed Churches in the Netherlands (Liberated)
 World Communion of Reformed Churches - a new ecumenical body of Presbyterian and Reformed churches represent over 80 million Reformed Christians worldwide
 World Reformed Fellowship - promotes unity between conservative Reformed churches

See also
 Dutch Reformed Church, Kalpitiya
 Dutch Reformed Church, Matara
 Groote Kerk, Galle
 Kayman's Gate

References

External links 
 
 localyte.com

Dutch Reformed Church
Evangelical denominations in Asia
Members of the World Reformed Fellowship
Members of the World Communion of Reformed Churches
Reformed denominations in Sri Lanka